Shotova is a rural locality (a village) in Karpogorskoye Rural Settlement of Pinezhsky District, Arkhangelsk Oblast, Russia. The population was 429 as of 2010. There are 12 streets.

Geography 
Shotova is located on the Pinega River, 6 km west of Karpogory (the district's administrative centre) by road. Karpogory is the nearest rural locality.

References 

Rural localities in Pinezhsky District